The yellow-bellied poison frog, yellow-bellied poison-arrow frog, or yellowbelly poison frog  (Andinobates fulguritus) is a species of frog in the family Dendrobatidae. It is found in northwestern Colombia (Chocó Department and the westernmost Antioquia and Risaralda) and east-central Panama.

Description
Males measure  and females  in snout–vent length. The dorsum is black with gold, yellow, or yellow-green dorso-lateral and lateral stripes (only the former are complete). On the anterior part of the dorsum there is an incomplete median stripe. The venter is gold or yellow and has black marbling or spots. The skin is slightly granular on the dorsum and moderately granular on the venter. The tympanum is round and has its postero-dorsal part concealed. The iris is black. Both fingers and toes lack fringes and webbing.

Habitat and conservation
Its natural habitats are tropical moist lowland forests. It is a locally common, terrestrial frog. The eggs are deposited in leaf-litter; both parents carry the tadpoles to leaf axils, usually bromeliads, where they complete their development.

It is threatened by habitat loss (deforestation) and pollution. This species seems not to be collected for pet trade.

References

fulguritus
Amphibians described in 1975
Amphibians of Colombia
Amphibians of Panama
Taxonomy articles created by Polbot